Isabel de Beaumont, Duchess of Lancaster, of the House of Brienne ( – 1361) was an English noblewoman, being the youngest daughter and child of Henry de Beaumont, Earl of Buchan and Alice Comyn.

Family 
Isabel was born in about 1320. She had nine older siblings, including John de Beaumont, 2nd Lord Beaumont. Isabel's paternal grandparents were Louis of Brienne, Viscount de Beaumont, and Agnes, Viscountess de Beaumont. Her maternal grandparents were Alexander Comyn, Sheriff of Aberdeen and Joan le Latimer. Louis of Brienne was a younger son of John of Brienne by his third wife, Berengaria of Leon while Alexander Comyn was a younger brother of John Comyn, Earl of Buchan.

Marriage and children 
She married Henry of Grosmont, 1st Duke of Lancaster in 1337. Isabel bore Henry two daughters who would eventually inherit their father's estates: 
Maud, Countess of Leicester (4 April 1339 – 10 April 1362), married William V, Count of Hainaut. Died without surviving issue.
Blanche, Countess of Lancaster (25 March 1345 – 12 September 1369), married John of Gaunt, son of Edward III of England, by whom she had three surviving children. Blanche inherited all her father's estates after the death of her sister.

Isabel died of the plague in 1361 at Leicester Castle. She was buried in Newark Abbey, Leicester. Her husband also died of the plague in March 1361.

Through Blanche, Isabel was an ancestress of Englands's Royal House of Lancaster, with Henry IV of England being her grandson. Philippa of Lancaster, Queen of Portugal and the Algarve and Elizabeth of Lancaster, Duchess of Exeter were also her grandchildren.

Daughters of Scottish earls
Lancaster
House of Brienne
1361 deaths
Year of birth unknown
14th-century deaths from plague (disease)
14th-century English nobility
14th-century English women